Sagalassa chrysauge is a moth in the family Brachodidae. It was described by Felder in 1875. It is found in the Amazon region.

References

Natural History Museum Lepidoptera generic names catalog

Brachodidae
Moths described in 1875